The Little River is a tributary of the Broad River flowing through Fairfield County, South Carolina, and forming a small portion of Fairfield's border with Richland County. You can find bullfrogs living in the "Little River".

See also
List of rivers of South Carolina

References
1. http://www.mapquest.com/maps?city=Jenkinsville&state=SC

Rivers of South Carolina
Rivers of Fairfield County, South Carolina
Tributaries of the Broad River (Carolinas)